Ernest McArthur Currie (May 12, 1892 – February 12, 1965) was an American politician. He served as mayor of Charlotte, North Carolina from 1941 to 1943. He was born in Fayetteville, North Carolina to Duncan Black and Katherine Lee (née McArthur) Currie. Currie attended the University of Paris, Davidson College (1916) and the University of North Carolina at Chapel Hill and earned a law degree. He also served in World War I. He was defeated by Herbert Hill Baxter in 1943 for the mayor's seat.

References

Mayors of Charlotte, North Carolina
1892 births
1965 deaths
North Carolina Democrats
Politicians from Fayetteville, North Carolina
University of Paris alumni
Davidson College alumni
University of North Carolina School of Law alumni
American military personnel of World War I
20th-century American politicians
American expatriates in France